The 2011 Men's Junior Pan-American Volleyball Cup was the first edition of the annual men's volleyball tournament, played by eight countries from June 22–27, 2011 in Panama City, Panama.

Competing nations

Preliminary round

Group A

Group B

Final round

Championship bracket

5th–8th places bracket

Quarterfinals

Classification 5/8

Semifinals

Seventh place match

Fifth place match

Bronze medal match

Final

Final standing

Individual awards

Most Valuable Player

Best Scorer

Best Spiker

Best Blocker

Best Server

Best Digger

Best Setter

Best Receiver

Best Libero

References

External links
 

Men's Pan-American Volleyball Cup
P
V
Volleyball